Nicolás Leguizamón (born 26 January 1995) is an Argentine professional footballer who plays as a forward for Argentine Primera División club Central Córdoba SdE.

Career
Leguizamón began with Argentine Primera División side Colón in 2016. He made his first-team debut in a Santa Fe derby on 23 April against Unión Santa Fe. In total, he made five appearances in the 2016 season but failed to score. He scored his first league goal for Colón in the following season, on 3 December, versus Huracán.

Personal life
He is the son of former footballer Oscar Leguizamón.

Career statistics
.

References

External links
 

1995 births
Living people
Footballers from Santa Fe, Argentina
Argentine footballers
Association football forwards
Argentine Primera División players
Club Atlético Colón footballers
Defensa y Justicia footballers
Central Córdoba de Santiago del Estero footballers